J. McIntyre Farm is a historic farm located near Newark, New Castle County, Delaware. The property includes five contributing buildings.  They are a stuccoed brick house with frame Gothic Revival style additions, a stone bank barn (c. 1830), and three late 19th century outbuildings: a braced frame corn crib, a braced frame machine shed, and a two-story granary covered with corrugated metal siding. The house is a two-story, three bay, brick building with an added central cross-gable, and a frame wing extending from its west endwall. The barn walls are constructed of large, dark fieldstones with large, rectangular quoins, and in places is covered with a pebbled stucco.

It was added to the National Register of Historic Places in 1986.

References

Farms on the National Register of Historic Places in Delaware
Gothic Revival architecture in Delaware
Houses in New Castle County, Delaware
1830 establishments in Delaware
National Register of Historic Places in New Castle County, Delaware